The historical video game is a video game genre in which stories are based upon historical events, environments, or people. Some historical video games are simulators, which attempt an accurate portrayal of a historical event, civilization or biography, to the degree that the available historical research will allow. Other historical video games are fictionalized tales that are based on mythology, legends or a fictional character within a historical setting.

Games set in Antiquity (10000 BC - 500 AD)

Games set in the Middle Ages (500-1500)

Games set in the Renaissance era (1500–1700)

Games set in the industrial era (1700–1900)

Games set in the Modern Period (1900–now)

References